This is a list of culinary specialities in Vietnamese cuisine by provinces.

An Giang Province 
 Khô cá lóc đồng
 Mắm thái Châu Đốc
 Bánh canh Vĩnh Trung, Tịnh Biên District
 Bò cạp chiên giòn, Bảy Núi mountainous area, Tịnh Biên District
 Mắm ruột
 Tung lò mò
 Khô cá tra phồng
 Bia chua Bảy Núi
 Bánh thốt nốt
 Bò cạp chiên
 Bún cá Long Xuyên
 Dưa xoài non

Bà Rịa–Vũng Tàu province 

 Ốc vú nàng, Côn Đảo island
 Bánh khọt Bà Rịa - a southern specialty consisting of small, fried rice flour pancakes

Bạc Liêu Province 

 Bún bò cay Bạc Liêu
 Chả Bạc Liêu

Bắc Giang Province 

 Bánh đa Kế - rice cracker

Bắc Kạn Province 

 Bánh Khẩu Thuy of Tay ethnic minority

Bắc Ninh Province 

 Bánh khoai Thị Cầu
 Bánh đa thôn Đoài - rice cracker
 Bánh phu thê Đình Bảng
 Chè lam - made from ground glutinous rice
 Bánh tẻ, Chờ village, Yên Phong District

Bến Tre Province 

 Coconut candy
 Mắm cá lài bay, Ba Tri District
 Bánh tráng Mỹ Lồng, Giồng Trôm District
 Bánh phồng Sơn Đốc, Giồng Trôm District

Bình Dương Province 

 Bánh bèo bì chợ Búng
 Bún tôm Châu Trúc

Bình Định Province 

 Bánh hỏi, Qui Nhơn - rice vermicelli woven into intricate bundles
 Bún chả cá Quy Nhơn, Qui Nhơn city
 Tré Bình Định
 Nem chợ Huyện, Tuy Phước District
 Rượu Bàu Đá
 Bánh tráng nước dừa
 Bánh xèo tôm nhảy

Bình Phước Province 
 Hạt điều rang muối - salt roasted cashews
 Bánh hạt điều - cashew crackers
 Gỏi trái điều - cashew fruit salad

Bình Thuận Province 

 Bánh quai vạc tôm thịt
 Bánh rế
 Gỏi ốc giác, Phan Thiết city

Cà Mau Province 

 Chả trứng mực
 Rùa - turtle
 Bánh tầm cari gà
 Bún nước lèo

Cần Thơ city 

 Nem nướng Cần Thơ - pork meatballs
 Cháo lòng Cái Tắc, Châu Thành A District
 Hủ tiếu
 Bánh cống
 Bánh xèo
 Bánh tét
 Rượu mận Sáu tia
 Khô cá tra

Cao Bằng Province 

 Phở chua
 Chè đắng

Đà Nẵng city 

See Quảng Nam Province's specialties

Đắk Lắk Province 

 Rượu cần
 Lẩu lá rừng - hot spot cooked from leaves collected from the forest
 Thịt nai - venison
 Cà đắng - bitter eggplant
 Cơm Lam
 Cà phê - coffee
 Bơ - avocado

Đắk Nông Province 

See Đắk Lắk Province's specialties

Điện Biên Province 

 Xôi nếp hương
 Chéo
 Bắp cải cuốn nhót xanh
 Thịt xông khói

Đồng Nai Province 

 Bưởi Tân Triều, Biên Hòa City
 Chôm chôm Long Khánh

Đồng Tháp Province 

 Nem Lai Vung, Lai Vung District
 Bánh Phồng Tôm - traditional snack made from ground shrimp, sometimes mixed with cuttlefish, arrowroot flour, tapioca flour, onion, garlic, sugar, fish sauce, cracked black pepper and salt.

Gia Lai Province 

 Phở khô Gia Lai

Hà Giang Province 

 Bánh cuốn trứng

Hà Nam Province 
 Bánh cuốn chả
 Bánh canh cá rô rau cải

Hà Nội

 Phở - Rice noodle soup
 Bánh cuốn Thanh Trì, Thanh Trì District
 Bánh tôm Hồ Tây - battered and deep fried julienned sweet potatoes with shrimps
 Bún ốc phủ Tây Hồ
 Bún chả cá Lã Vọng - fish fillets that are grilled then pan fried and served with Bún and vegetables.
 Rươi
 Cốm
 Bún chả Hà Nội - thin rice vermicelli served cold with grilled marinated pork similar to Bún thịt nướng
 Bún đậu mắm tôm - Pressed vermicelli noodles with fried tofu served with shrimp paste
 Phở cuốn Ngũ Xã
 Kem Tràng Tiền
 Ô mai
 Bánh chả
 Bún thang
 Bún mọc

Hà Tây Province 

 Cháo vịt Vân Đình, Ứng Hoà District
 Tương Cự Đà, Cự Khê commune, Thanh Oai District
 Nem Phùng

Hà Tĩnh Province 

 Kẹo cu đơ
 Rượu Can Lộc

Hải Dương Province 

 Bánh đậu xanh - sweet mung bean paste
 Rượu Phú Lộc

Hải Phòng 

 Bánh đa cua - red noodles with crabs
 Chả giò cua biển
 Bún tôm Hải Phòng

Hậu Giang Province 

 Bún mắm Phụng Hiệp - vermicelli noodle soup with a heavy shrimp paste broth
 Cháo lòng Cái Tắc - Rice porridge with pork's offal

Hòa Bình Province 

 Cá nướng sông Đà
 Măng đắng nướng
 Măng chua nấu thịt gà
 Chả cuốn lá bưởi
 Thịt lợn muối chua
 Thịt trâu nấu lá lồm
 Canh Loóng
 Chả rau đáu
 Cơm Lam

Ho Chi Minh City / Sai Gon 

 Bánh Bột Chiên - A Chinese influenced pastry that exists in many versions all over Asia; the Vietnamese version features a special tangy soy sauce on the side, rice flour cubes with fried eggs and some vegetables. This is a popular after-school snack for young students.
 Gỏi ba khía lá lìm kìm, Cần Giờ District
 Sâm bổ lượng
 Mì Chợ Lớn
 Cơm tấm (sườn, bì, chả, trứng) (Sai Gon Vietnamese Broken Rice)
 Gỏi cuốn (Sai Gon Fresh Spring Rolls)

Hưng Yên Province 

 Tương bần
 Bánh dày làng Gàu, Gàu village, Cửu Cao commune, Văn Giang District - white, flat, round glutinous rice cake with tough, chewy texture filled with mung bean or served with Vietnamese sausage (Giò lụa)

Khánh Hòa Province 

 Nem nướng Ninh Hoà, Ninh Hòa District
 Bún mực Vạn Ninh, Vạn Ninh District
 Bánh canh chả cá -  the dish includes fish sausage
 Bún cá sứa - noodles with jellyfish
 Bánh ướt Diên Khánh, Diên Khánh District - thin pancake wrapper consisting of rice noodle sheets

Kiên Giang Province 

 Gỏi cá trích, Phú Quốc island
 Bánh canh cá thu, Phú Quốc island
 Rượu sim, Phú Quốc island
 Bún cá Kiên Giang

Kon Tum Province 

 Gỏi lá Kon Tum
 Dế chiên
 Cá chua
 Cơm Lam

Lai Châu Province 

 Xôi tím
 Cá bống vùi tro
 Pa pỉnh tộp
 Rêu đá
 Nộm rau dớn
 Thịt treo gác bếp

Lạng Sơn Province 
 Khâu nhục
 Lợn quay
 Phở chua
 Bánh cuốn trứng

Lào Cai Province 

 Cuốn sủi
 Thắng cố ngựa
 Gạo Séng Cù
 Mận hậu Bắc Hà
 Tương ớt Mường Khương
 Rượu ngô Bắc Hà
 Rượu Shan Lùng
 Rượu thóc Nậm Pung

Lâm Đồng Province 
 Artichoke (Atisô)
 Rau và hoa Đà Lạt
 Trà Bảo Lộc
 Các loại dâu ở Đà Lạt
 Rượu vang Đà Lạt
 Bánh mỳ xíu mại, lẩu gà lá é, bánh ướt lòng gà,... Đà Lạt

Long An Province 

 Rượu đế Gò Đen, Mỹ Yên commune, Bến Lức District

Nam Định Province 

 Bánh gai
 Bánh nhãn
 Bánh xíu páo
 Bún Cá Nam Định - Nam Định Fish Noodle Soup
 Chè kho

Ninh Bình Province 

 Cơm cháy Ninh Bình - scorched rice, similar to the Chinese dish, Guoba
 Gỏi cá sống Kim Sơn, Kim Sơn District
 Mắm rươi
 Thịt dê Ninh Bình - A goat dish from Ninh Bình
 Bún mọc Kim Sơn - Rice 
noodles used in a bowl with fresh pork meat made into small balls, boiled bones water

Ninh Thuận Province 

 Dông 7 món
 Cơm gà Ninh Thuận
 Gỏi cá mai

Nghệ An Province 

 Bánh mướt, Quy Chính village, Nam Đàn District
 Bánh đúc hến, Nam Đàn District - cakes made from either non-glutinous rice flour or corn flour with clams
 Cháo lươn Nghệ An

Phú Thọ Province 

 Bánh tai
 Cơm nắm lá cọ
 Cọ ỏm
 Tằm cọ
 Trám om kho cá
 Rau sắn
 Xôi nếp gà gáy
 Thịt chua
 Bưởi Đoan Hùng

Phú Yên Province 

 Bánh hỏi lòng heo Gò Duối, Gò Duối market, Xuân Lộc commune, Sông Cầu District

Quảng Bình Province 

 Bánh bèo
 Bánh lọc
 Cháo bánh canh
 Bánh khoái
 Chép chép

Quảng Nam Province 

 Cao lầu Hội An
 Mì Quảng
 Bê thui Cầu Mống
 Cháo bò Đà Nẵng
 Bánh tráng đập
 Gà luộc đèo Le, Quế Sơn District
 Phở sắn, Quế Sơn District
 Cơm gà Tam Kỳ, Tam Ky chicken rice

Quảng Ninh Province 

 Chả mực Hạ Long -  Grilled chopped squid Hạ Long
 Nem chua Quảng Yên

Quảng Ngãi Province 

 Cá bống sông Trà
 Kẹo mạch nha, Thi Phổ village, Đức Phổ District
 Kẹo gương
 Quế Trà Bồng
 Don

Quảng Trị Province 
 Bún hến, Village of Mai Xá, Gio Mai - thin rice vermicelli noodles with clams
 Bánh học, Village of Mai Xá, Gio Mai

Sóc Trăng Province 

 Bún nước lèo, also in Trà Vinh province - 
 Bún gỏi dà Sóc Trăng
 Bánh pía - Teochew-style mooncake

Sơn La Province 

 Chè Tà Xùa, Tà Xùa commune, Bắc Yên District

Tây Ninh Province 

 Bánh canh Trảng Bàng - bánh canh made in town of Trang Bang, served with boiled pork, rice paper, and local herbs
 Trảng Bàng dew-wetted rice paper
 Cháo bồi

Tiền Giang Province 

 Hủ tiếu Mỹ Tho - clear pork broth with rice vermicelli and wheat flour noodles (mì)
 Bò viên - beef balls

Tuyên Quang Province 

 Cam sành Hàm Yên
 Rượu ngô Na Hang
 Bánh gai Chiêm Hóa
 Cá chiên và cá bỗng sông Lô
 Gạo thơm và vịt bầu Tuyên Quang
 Bánh nếp nhân trứng kiến
 Bánh khảo
 Bánh mật
 Bánh nẳng

Thái Bình Province 

 Bánh cáy

Thái Nguyên Province 

 Chè Thái Nguyên
 Trám Hà Châu
 Bánh cooc mò
 Măng đắng
 Bánh ngải
 Nem chua Đại Từ
 Bánh chưng Bờ Đậu
 Tôm cuốn Thừa Lâm
 Cơm lam Định Hóa
 Đậu phụ Bình Long

Thanh Hóa Province 

 Nem chua Thanh Hóa
 Bánh đúc sốt, Lam Sơn ward, Thanh Hóa city

Thừa Thiên–Huế Province 

See also Vietnamese Imperial Meals and Vietnamese Kings Offering Meals

 Bún bò Huế
 Gỏi cá sanh cầm - raw fish salad
 Mắm sò Lăng Cô
 Tré Huế - Fermented/cured shrimp - similar to nem chua
 Bánh bèo
 Cơm hến - rice with clams
 Bún hến - rice noodles with clams & clam sauce
 Bánh nậm - flat rice flour dumpling from Huế stuffed with minced pork and mushroom, and seasoned with pepper and spices; wrapped in a banana leaf
 Bánh bột lọc - cassava cake packed with shrimp
 Cuốn cá nục
 Bánh gói chợ Cầu
 Bánh tét làng Chuồn, Phú An commune, Phú Vang District
 Chè nhãn bọc hạt sen - made from longan and lotus seeds
 Chè đậu ngự - made from Phaseolus lunatus (or moon beans) - an imperial dish
 Cuốn ram
 Bánh khoái Thượng Tứ
 Bánh phong Kim Long
 Chạo tôm
 Mè xửng Huế - a chewy sesame candy
 Bánh lá chả tôm
 Bánh ít Huế
 Bánh đúc

Trà Vinh Province 

 Cơm cà ri dê - goat curry rice
 Bánh ống Trà Vinh

Vĩnh Long Province 
 Bưởi năm roi - Five rod grapefruit
 Thanh trà - Tea fruit

Vĩnh Phúc Province 
 Vó cần - Water dropwort salad (Hương Canh, Bình Xuyên)
 Nem chua Vĩnh Yên
 Bánh gio Tây Đình, Tây Đình, Bình Xuyên District
 Cá thính chua, Sông Lô District
 Chè kho (Lập Thạch)
 Bánh nẳng (Lập Thạch)
 Bánh gạo rang - Fried rice cake (Lập Thạch)

Yên Bái Province 

 Cá sỉnh
 Bánh chim gâu
 Khoai tím Lục Yên
 Mận tam hoa
 Măng Bát Độ
 Nếp Tú Lệ
 Cam Văn Chấn
 Mọc vịt Lục Yên
 Thịt trâu gác bếp
 Bọ xít nhãn chiên giòn
 Dế mèn rán
 Bánh chưng đen Mường Lò
 Chè Tuyết Suối Giàng

See also

 Vietnamese cuisine
 Vietnamese noodles
 List of Vietnamese dishes
 List of Vietnamese ingredients

References

Culinary specialities